J. J. Wolf was the defending champion but lost in the second round to Nam Ji-sung.

Mikael Torpegaard won the title after defeating Nam 6–1, 7–5 in the final.

Seeds
All seeds receive a bye into the second round.

Draw

Finals

Top half

Section 1

Section 2

Bottom half

Section 3

Section 4

References

External links
Main draw
Qualifying draw

2019 ATP Challenger Tour
Columbus Challenger